Parliamentary elections were held in Greece on 31 March 1946. The result was a victory for the United Alignment of Nationalists, an alliance that included the People's Party, the National Liberal Party, and the Reform Party, which won 206 of the 354 seats in Parliament. As a result Konstantinos Tsaldaris became Prime Minister leading a right-wing coalition. Nonetheless, he soon decided to resign in favor of Themistoklis Sophoulis, who led a government of national unity (conservative and centre-liberal forces) during the entire second phase of the civil war (1946–1949). One of the priorities of the new government was the proclamation of a plebiscite for the restoration of the Greek monarchy.

The elections were marked by the boycott of the Communist Party of Greece claiming in protest against the unfolding, state-tolerated White Terror against the former members of EAM-ELAS. The night before the elections, a communist band attacked a police station in Litochoro. This event is considered the beginning of the three years civil war.

One of the reasons for the defeat of the centre-liberal parties was the division of the Liberal Party, founded by Eleftherios Venizelos. One faction remained loyal to the leadership of Themistoklis Sophoulis, while another faction followed Sophoklis Venizelos, who formed a coalition with Georgios Papandreou and Panayiotis Kanellopoulos.

Results

References

Parliamentary elections in Greece
Legislative election
1940s in Greek politics
Greece
Greek Civil War
Greece
Election and referendum articles with incomplete results
Legl